The 2014 PBA All-Star Weekend was the annual all-star weekend of the Philippine Basketball Association (PBA)'s 2013–14 season. The events were held at the Mall of Asia Arena in Pasay.

Friday events

Obstacle Challenge
Time in seconds.

Gold represent the current champion.
Terrence Romeo did not participate in this event.
Mark Barroca won in this year's Obstacle Challenge.

Three-point Shootout

Gold represent the current champion.
LA Tenorio replaced Mac Baracael, who did not participate in this event.
John Wilson replaced James Yap, who did not participate in this event.
Mark Macapagal won in this event, making this his fourth title.

Slamdunk Contest

Gold represents the current champion.
Alex Nuyles replaced Arwind Santos in this event.
Justin Melton and Rey Guevarra are co-champions for this event.
The scores in the parentheses were for the first round.

Greats vs. Stalwarts

Rosters

 Vergel Meneses was unable to participate. 
 Jason Webb was unable to participate. 
 Jervy Cruz was unable to participate. 
 Bal David was unable to participate. 
 Vergel Meneses was unable to participate due to injury. 
 Topex Robinson was Terrence Romeo's replacement. 
 Justin Melton was Jervy Cruz's replacement.

Game

Rey Guevarra was named the MVP for this game.

Sunday events

Gilas Pilipinas vs. PBA All-Stars

Roster

Game

Gary David was named the All Star Game MVP.

References

See also
2013–14 PBA season
Philippine Basketball Association
Philippine Basketball Association All-Star Weekend

2014
2013–14 PBA season
Philippines men's national basketball team games